Fulk Basset (died 4 May 1271) was archbishop of Dublin. He was the elder brother of John de Sandford, who was also Archbishop of Dublin from 1284 to 1290.

He was called Fulk de Sandford and also Fulk Basset, owing to his relationship to the prominent landowning Basset family of Devon and Cornwall. Having been Archdeacon of Middlesex and treasurer and chancellor of St Paul's Cathedral, London, he was appointed archbishop of Dublin by Pope Alexander IV in 1256, after the Pope rejected the election of Ralph de Norwich, the  Lord  Chancellor of Ireland, whom  he considered to be too worldly and luxurious in his manner of living, and "entirely devoted to the King's interests".

He took some slight part in the government of Ireland under Henry III, although he refused an offer to become Justiciar of Ireland, no doubt fearing that so onerous and was beyond his abilities.He died at Finglas on 4 May 1271. He was buried in St. Patrick's Cathedral, Dublin; his brother John was buried in the same tomb in 1294.

His death led to a long struggle between rival candidates for the See, Fromund Le Brun  and William de la Corner, which was not resolved until 1279, when they were both passed over in favour of John de Derlington, who died in England before he could assume office as Archbishop. His successor was Fulke's brother John, who preferred to use the surname de Sandford.

References

Sources

Year of birth missing
1271 deaths
Archdeacons of Middlesex
Archbishops of Dublin
13th-century Roman Catholic archbishops in Ireland
Burials at St Patrick's Cathedral, Dublin
Chancellors of St Paul's Cathedral